Museo is a station on line 1 of the Naples Metro. It was opened on 5 April 2001 as the eastern terminus of the section of the line between Vanvitelli and Museo. On 27 March 2002 the line was extended to Dante. The station is located between Materdei and Dante. Materdei station was added to the line on 5 July 2003, and before that date, the adjacent station was Salvator Rosa.

References

Naples Metro stations
Railway stations opened in 2001
2001 establishments in Italy
Railway stations in Italy opened in the 21st century